SWAT Kats: The Radical Squadron is an animated series for television created by Christian Tremblay and Yvon Tremblay and produced by Hanna-Barbera and Turner Program Services. The following is a list of characters appearing in the series.

Characters

Heroes
 Razor (voiced by Barry Gordon) - Jake Clawson is the smaller size but older member of the SWAT Kats, who is a confident leader and an ace mechanical genius that designed the various gadgets and advanced weaponry used in the Turbokat. Razor serves as the radar interceptor and weapons control officer, or RIO, in the Turbokat. He is a martial arts master. Razor is the more measured, and restrained, of the two kats. In "Razor's Edge", he lost his self-confidence in his fighting because he had "hurt" two pedestrians, but recovered from this upon discovering it was a set-up by Dark Kat. Razor loved the late-night show with David Litterbin (a parody of David Letterman). His catchphrase is "Bingo!" His costume is similar to Batman.
 T-Bone (voiced by Charlie Adler) - Chance Furlong is the larger size but slightly younger member of the SWAT Kats and pilot of the Turbokat jet. T-Bone is one of the best pilots in the SWAT Kat universe, as seen in "Cry Turmoil." He is Jake's best friend, ultimate rival, and an ally. T-Bone loves aerial warfare history as seen in "The Ghost Pilot" and Scaredy Kat cartoons. It was revealed in "The Ci-Kat-A" that he had a strong dislike of bugs that he eventually overcame. In "Mutation City", it was revealed that he was unable to swim, though later in the episode, he learned, and rescued an unconscious Razor from drowning. T-Bone is very protective of his partner and the Turbokat and gets extremely upset if anything happens to either. He is also the more daring of the two—in his willingness to take chances (especially when in the Turbokat). T-Bone commonly flew the Turbokat out of tough situations, refusing to eject, and coaxing his "baby"— the Turbokat — to perform His costume is Similar to Captain America.

Supporting characters
 Mayor Manx (voiced by Jim Cummings) - The Mayor of Megakat City for 10 terms. He spent nearly all of his time working on his golf game as Callie once stated to the Metallikats that "he hasn't done an ounce of paperwork in years!" He also tried to rent out Megakat Towers to investors; a first-season running gag had the building constantly being ruined in "Destructive Nature" and "The Ci-Kat-A." Mayor Manx was descended from a famous and brave fighter pilot named the Blue Manx who was the sworn enemy of Red Lynx, as revealed in "The Ghost Pilot." But in contrast to his ancestor, Mayor Manx was a coward who usually ran and hid whenever danger arose, but he did act bravely and shoot down the ghost of the Red Lynx in the same episode–-doing so only after Razor goaded him into action on the grounds that he would not be re-elected if he did not fight back. His name was derived from the Manx cat breed.
 Calico "Callie" Briggs (voiced by Tress MacNeille) - The Deputy Mayor of Megakat City and the one who is really in charge. The SWAT Kats' biggest supporter, she had a radio communicator which enabled her to call them directly when danger threatened the city. Although she did not know who they were, Callie usually trusted her life to the SWAT Kats if required. In "The Dark Side of the SWAT Kats", her equivalent in a parallel universe was an Evil ally of Dark Kat. In "Bride of the Pastmaster", her ancestor Queen Callista was the leader of the medieval kingdom of "Megalith City." Though Razor had a crush on her (more evident in the fact that even her ancestor seemed to favor Razor over T-Bone), likewise, she also seemed to favor Jake and only saw Chance as a friend. Her name was a pun on Calico cat.
 Enforcers - The Enforcers are the militarized police force of Megakat City.
 Commander Ulysses Feral (voiced by Gary Owens) - Head of the Enforcers, Feral had a strong and obviously deep hatred for the SWAT Kats, whom he considered "reckless vigilantes." He had worked with the SWAT Kats when the situation called for it such as in "Katastrophe" and "A Bright and Shiny Future", but he more often called on his men saying "The Enforcers will handle this" and "Get me chopper back-up!" Ironically, he is solely responsible for the birth of the SWAT Kats. When Jake and Chance were Enforcers, they were kicked out of the force for their disobedience during an aerial assault against Dark Kat and forced to work at the city junkyard to pay off a hefty debt from the damage of Enforcer HQ....all of which Feral himself was also responsible for which he took no responsibility for. He sees them as nothing more than "ruthless vigilantes", but is likely jealous because they make him and the Enforcers look very incompetent. He would go as far as to issue an "arrest on sight" if the duo would go too far. Despite his ego, he has a strict sense of justice and tries his best to battle the threats that plague Megakat City. It is uncertain if he has any respect for the SWAT Kats. When the Metallikats offered to reveal the identities of the SWAT Kats in exchange for their freedom, he rejected the offer quoting "I don't deal with scum" and used the EMP device on them.
 Lt. Felina Feral (voiced by Lori Alan) - Commander Ulysses Feral's niece (she was the daughter of Feral's brother) first appeared in season 2's "Mutation City" as a new female heroine. Being something of a reckless hot-head herself, she appreciated the help of the SWAT Kats and would work openly with them. Feral himself faced something of a dilemma over her: trying to keep her out of danger but not show any favorable treatment. Furthermore, he has stated that Felina was too good an officer to eject off the force, and his brother would never speak to him again. She was also a very skilled pilot, as seen in "When Strikes Mutilor" and "Cry Turmoil." She wouldn't take "No" for an answer, a fact to which T-Bone once remarked, "You are one stubborn she-kat!"
 Lt. Commander Steel (voiced by Hal Rayle) - A high-ranking Enforcer who constantly seeks to replace Commander Feral as leader of the Enforcers. He is actually a bit of a coward and shows no real leadership skills, simply sitting at Feral's desk and dismissing people even if they were victims of a crime. He is also prone to getting airsick. During one mission that involved fighting Dark Kat, Feral forces Steel to ride co-pilot in a battle. Steel gets airsick and ends up vomiting in the cockpit. Feral notices this and responds with heavy disdain "And you want my job." Steel was later dropped after season two.
 Sgt. Talon (voice by Ed Gilbert in season one, Jim Cummings in season two) - One of Feral's top Enforcer officers. He says little and carries out Feral's orders without question. He serves as Feral's second in command in the field whenever Felina isn't around.
 Ann Gora (voiced by Candi Milo) - The star reporter for Kats Eye News. She was usually on the scene whenever the SWAT Kats were in action and had been rescued by the SWAT Kats in "The Ci-Kat-A" and "Caverns of Horror." Besides Deputy Mayor Briggs, Ann had also warned the SWAT Kats of dangerous situations a few times. Her name was a pun on the Turkish Angora.
 Jonny K. (voiced by Mark Hamill) - Ann Gora's cameraman who often cared about Ann's safety, whenever she got herself in danger. He spoke very little and was seen always wearing sunglasses and a red baseball cap. His largest roles were in "The Ci-Kat-A" and "Caverns of Horror", where he helped the SWAT Kats along with Ann Gora. A running gag is that Johnny's camera is always destroyed.
 Al (voiced by Frank Welker in "The Wrath of Dark Kat", Rob Paulsen in "Night of the Dark Kat") - Al is the pilot of the Kat's Eye News helicopter. Although he is a professional at his job, he often shows contempt for Ann Gora's reckless nature. Several times, he refused to fly the helicopter near dangerous areas despite Ann's nagging, such as when Hard Drive stole the Turbokat.
 Dr. Abby Sinian (voiced by Linda Gary) - Archaeologist and curator of the Megakat City Museum of History. Smart, beautiful and brave as well as tops in her field, Dr. Sinian don't hesitate to get down and dirty when working an archeological site or panic when in danger (encounters with a prehistoric cat, Pastmaster, mummies, etc.). Unlike most scientists in her field, Dr. Sinian does not limit herself to the factual and tangible; she is an expert on the supernatural and the occult and often proves useful in situations involving villains like the Pastmaster. As Curator of the Megakat Museum of History, Dr. Sinian often proves to be an excellent informational resource for when creatures and villains from the past manage to make a comeback in the modern realm. Her name was a pun on the Abyssinian cat.
 Professor Hackle (voiced by George Hearn) - Professor Hackle was the scientist who spent his life as a military weapons researcher for Pumadyne. He later renounced his profession and turned to the civilian sector. Professor Hackle was the one who built the robot bodies of Mac and Molly Mange and transplanted their brains into them while trying to make them model robots. In "Metal Urgency," Professor Hackle gave a complaint call to Pumadyne about his inventions being misused. Professor Hackle later provided Commander Feral with an EMP device to use on the Metallikats. In "The Deadly Pyramid", Professor Hackle created Cybertron, a friendly and very brave little robot to help the SWAT Kats. In "A Bright and Shiny Future," a future version of him restored the damaged Turbokat to its flying condition and subsequently reprogrammed the Machines who had taken over the city after Razor and T-Bone destroyed the Robotics HQ.

Villains
 Dark Kat (voiced by Brock Peters) - Dark Kat was the main arch-enemy of the SWAT Kats. He is a very large, intelligent, and evil purple-skinned kat that wears a black and red hooded coat. Dark Kat wanted to destroy Megakat City to create a new lawless town called "Dark Kat City". Being highly intelligent and calculating, Dark Kat often anticipated his foes' actions with great accuracy, and it was a recurring theme throughout the series that all of his hideouts are rigged with explosives. He first appeared in "The Wrath of Dark Kat." His attempt to bomb the Enforcer headquarters indirectly led to Jake and Chance's employment termination from the Enforcers and the birth of the SWAT Kats. He was the only main villain who never got an origin story of his own in the series. However, some promotional material for the series depicted him as being a judge in Megakat City by day and he would use this to hide his criminal life. This was never referred to in the show. While "Night of the Dark Kat" was the only episode where Dark Kat was apprehended, other episodes featuring him had Dark Kat getting away. He is similar to Skeletor from He-Man.
 Creeplings (vocal effects provided by Charlie Adler) - Small pink bat-like creatures of unidentified origins that were extremely vicious and appeared to be protected from radiation. They served as Dark Kat's primary henchmen.
 Dr. Viper (voiced by Frank Welker) - Dr. Elrod Purvis was a greedy scientist who worked at Megakat Biochemical Labs. As shown in "The Origin of Dr. Viper", he tried to steal an experimental regenerative formula he and his idealistic colleague Dr. N. Zyme were developing. He became covered in the formula when he fell down the stairs and the shock ultimately killed him. The chemicals revived him from death, mutating Purvis into a sociopathic half-cat, half-snake creature. With expertise in the fields of biology, genetics, and robotics, he sought to turn Megakat City into "Megaswamp City" and transform the residents into mutants like himself. Dr. Viper first appeared in "The Giant Bacteria" where he was able to turn the four-eyed Morbulus into a bacteria monster. Dr. Viper was by far the deadliest enemy of the SWAT Kats and he and his creatures murdered a number of innocent people in the series. The only weapon he has on hand is his tail which he uses to smack his enemies away. In "Mutation City", Dr. Viper where he floods Megakat City with a slimy orange ooze created from the experimental formula Katalyst X-63. He even douses himself with the formula and turns into a giant Godzilla-like monster and rampages through the city. In this state, he attempted to stop Razor from using the anti-mutagen, but ultimately failed and was caught in the anti-mutagen's explosion which turned everything to its normal state. He was similar to the Spider-Man villain Lizard.
 Mac and Molly Mange (voiced by Neil Ross and April Winchell) - The husband-and-wife criminal team similar to Bonnie and Clyde, Mac and Molly Mange both used to head the most notorious mob syndicate in Megakat City. They drowned when the boat they were in was hit by a larger boat while attempting to escape from Alkatraz prison. Their bodies were found by Professor Hackle's robot servants and their minds were placed in the brains of robots. Mac was supposed to be a robot-chauffeur (though ironically, he was a poor driver) and Molly was to be a robot-maid, but instead remained criminals and took on the moniker of The Metallikats. They first appeared in "The Metallikats" where they kill Katscratch, a rival mob boss who took over their territory and injured the rest of his gang. They had a vendetta against Mayor Manx for denying their parole request, though it turned out that Callie had done it as the mayor was too busy to handle it. Mac and Molly often bickered with each other, but do love each other and would come to each other's aid when one was in trouble. Mac was considered the "muscle" of the team while Molly was considered the "brains." In "Metal Urgency", they both discovered the secret identities of the SWAT Kats. However, this knowledge was erased when Commander Feral deactivated them with Professor Hackle's EMP device in the same episode as Commander Feral quotes "I don't deal with scum" when they offered to reveal the SWAT Kats' identities to him. In "Katastrophe", their remains were salvaged by the Creeplings when Dark Kat collaborated with Dr. Viper in a plot to eliminate the SWAT Kats. Dark Kat had special collars placed on the Metallikats' necks which give them a shock when they don't do what Dark Kat says. They were sent to capture Mayor Manx and Callie Briggs which was a success. This ended up drawing the SWAT Kats and Commander Feral to the villains' hideout at an abandoned offshore cannery. When the Metallikats turned against Dark Kat, he discovered that Dr. Viper deactivated the collars. In a battle between the villains, Commander Feral, and the SWAT Kats, the villains were defeated and were thought to have been destroyed. In "A Bright and Shiny Future", the SWAT Kats follow Pastmaster into a future where Pastmaster had reassembled the Metallikats, had taken over the robots, and did away with that time period's SWAT Kats. The Metallikats turn on Pastmaster and have their robots steal his watch while knocking him into the river. With help from that time period's Commander Feral, Felina Feral, Professor Hackle, and the Pastmaster, the SWAT Kats defeated the Metallikats as Professor Hackle reprograms all the robots and Pastmaster reclaims his watch. In "Unlikely Alloys" the Metallikats attempt to rob a mint, but the Swat Kats intervene, resulting in Molly being severely injured and Mac losing his arm. Mac steals Dr. Greenbox's Micro Brain Repair Unit to repair himself and Molly. However, the invention gains sentience and assimilates various appliances and weapons, dubbing itself Zed. Though Zed was at first compliant to the Metallikats, it decided they were inferior and assimilated Mac. Molly aided the SWAT Kats and Dr. Greenbox to stop Zed but upon realizing Mac was connected to Zed and would shut down upon Zed's destruction, the Swat Kats were forced to allow Zed to assimilate Molly. When Zed was destroyed the Metallikats were presumed deceased but survived, though Mac was fused with a food processor. In some ways, they are quite similar to the Superman villain Metallo.
 The Pastmaster (voiced by Keene Curtis) - An undead sorcerer from the Dark Ages who tried to conquer his home city. He traveled through time using his magical mechanical pocket watch, and with his magical spellbook "The Tome of Time", he was able to summon extinct or mythical creatures such as dinosaurs and dragons. He despised all forms of modern technology and was constantly trying to rid the world of it and return things to the former "glory" of his beloved Dark Ages. He first appeared in "The Pastmaster Always Rings Twice" when two cats unknowingly unearth the chest that he was imprisoned in. In "A Bright and Shiny Future," the SWAT Kats were drawn into a future where the Metallikats together with the Pastmaster had created a Terminator-inspired future where machines ruled over katkind. All the Pastmaster really wanted was to go back home to his own time. After the Metallikats were defeated, the Pastmaster reclaimed his watch and unwittingly took the SWAT Kats back to their own time as they send the Pastmaster into a portal to the past. He was occasionally shown to lust after Callie Briggs (the "spitting," or spirit-and-body, the image of her ancestor Queen Callista who is the Pastmaster's ancient crush). He repeatedly captured her and "asked" her to marry him, but Callie would have none of it. He apparently met his demise in "The Deadly Pyramid" where during the collapse of the pyramid, he was seen falling towards a pit of molten lava.
 Hard Drive (voiced by Rob Paulsen) - Hard Drive is a technological thief who generally dons his "Surge Coat" when working. This coat gives him a number of abilities focused around electricity and electronics, as the name suggests. Primarily seen is his ability to transform himself into electrical energy, thus allowing him to travel through power, telephone, and computer lines. Besides this, he appears to be able to manipulate electronic devices with a simple jolt of electricity from his fingertip and download and delete data quickly with a "plug" on his coat. He works for whoever pays him the most. However, he is powerless without his surge coat and is actually very scrawny. Prior to his first appearance, he apparently hijacked teller machines. His first appearance was in "Night of the Dark Kat" where he breaks into a top-secret military research center and stolen defense secrets. The SWAT Kats track his surge signal and subdue him in a specially insulated missile. After being taken to a jail cell, Hard Drive is broken out by Dark Kat and his Creeplings. Freeing Hard Drive from the insulated missile, Dark Kat forces Hard Drive to team up with him to help capture, discredit and destroy the SWAT Kats using the Turbokat to hold the city hostage. Hard Drive is defeated when Razor destroyed his Surge Coat. Both of them were turned over to the Enforcers. In "Metal Urgency", Hard Drive had hijacked a heavily armed tank from Pumadyne and its forcefield prevented the Enforcers' attacks from getting through. The SWAT Kats managed to disable Hard Drive with a Scrambler Missile. In "SWAT Kats Unplugged", Hard Drive sports a new Surge Coat and steals an anti-weapons scrambler from Pumadyne scientist Dr. Ohm before he can inform Dr. Cougar that it was ready. He uses the anti-weapons scrambler in a plot to steal the gold being transferred to Megakat Mint. After hijacking a state-of-the-art jet, Hard Drive was pursued by the SWAT Kats and apprehended. Hard Drive was similar to the Spider-Man villain Electro.
 Morbulus (voiced by Jim Cummings) - An evil pilot who literally has eyes in the back of his head, appearing in "The Giant Bacteria." He bombs oil refineries with his fighter jet until defeated by the SWAT Kats. After giving the SWAT Kats the slip, he is found by Dr. Viper near a sewer pipe and mutated into a grotesque purple bacteria monster that divides into more of itself (in the style of amoeba) when hit. All of the bacteria monsters (there were three) were killed by the SWAT Kats using electricity with Burke and Murray cleaning up the bacteria monsters' remains. Morbulus' name was originally going to be "Occulus," but it was changed at the last minute due to possible legal problems with Marvel Comics.
 Katscratch (voiced by Jim Cummings) - A gangster who used to work for Mac and Molly Mange. He was known for smuggling catnip, which is seen as a narcotic in the SWAT Kats universe, in a trade with Fango. His name appears to be a reference to the song "Cat Scratch Fever." When Mac and Molly Mange returned as the Metallikats, they killed off Katscratch for his betrayal.
 Fango (voiced by Neil Ross) - Katscratch's business partner who was badly injured in the explosion caused by Mac Mange's exploding cigar. As the paramedics prepared to take him to the hospital, he informed Commander Feral that the Metallikats are Mac and Molly Mange and were advancing to their next target: Mayor Manx.
 Katscratch's Mobsters (voiced by Jim Cummings, Charlie Adler, and Ed Gilbert) - Four identical-looking mobsters who worked for Katscratch up until his death. Katscratch's henchmen swore their loyalty to the Metallikats only for them to dismiss them as the Metallikats make up their own gang. Not much is known about them other than they alongside Fango were badly injured in the fire from Mac Mange's exploding cigar.
 Rex Shard (voiced by John Vernon) - A convict sentenced to life in prison, who was accidentally exposed to the radiation of an experimental diamond mining machine created by Dr. Greenbox when testing it out in a mine for Warden Cyrus Meece (whom Shard always hated). He turned into a crystal colossus and had the ability to turn anything he touched into a crystal. He was stopped by the SWAT Kats, reverted to normal, and was sent back to prison. He appeared only in "Chaos in Crystal", but was supposed to appear in the proposed 3rd-season episode "Cold War" as a weather-controlling mutant warrior with plans to freeze Megakat City after diving into an experiment energy source.
 The Ci-Kat-A (vocal effects provided by Frank Welker) - A race of cicada-like aliens with a mild resemblance to a cat that can transform a creature into a Ci-Kat-A with a bite. A Ci-Kat-A queen left its home planet and cocooned itself in space. The queen stowed away on a Masa space shuttle which landed on Earth. At a Masa lab, the queen infected Dr. Harley Street, other scientists, and the guards. The queen laid several eggs which hatched into Ci-Kat-A drones while Dr. Street fed the Ci-Kat-A radiation from the site, though the queen needed more. The Swat Kats and the Enforcers arrived to save the Kat's Eye News crew, which had been trapped inside the building. The Swat Kats rescued the crew and Feral blew up the lab. However, the queen escaped from the lab with Dr. Street to go to the Metrokat Nuclear Power Plant. The queen succeeded and feasted on the radiation and transformed into a giant. The queen made a hive at Metrokat Tower, where the drones assimilated some Enforcer pilots. When Feral used flamethrowers to destroy the hive the queen attempted to flee. The queen grabbed Razor, but T-Bone managed to tie the queen up and save Razor. The queen was then crushed by a piece of the burning Megakat Tower.
 Dr. Harley Street (voiced by Robert Ridgely) - Dr. Harley Street was a brilliant astronomer who was bitten by an alien insect creature and later mutated into one himself. Dr. Harley Street tried to help the alien queen to achieve its full power by letting her eat the radioactive material from Megakat Nuclear Power Plant. Dr. Harley Street was thrown out of the Megakat Tower by Razor. He only appeared in "The Ci-Kat-A", but was supposed to appear in the unfinished episode "Doctors of Doom" where Dr. Harley Street resurfaces and teams up with Dr. Viper to create havoc in Megakat City.
 Madkat (voiced by Roddy McDowall) – Ages ago, Madkat was an insane and powerful court jester who was replaced. He sought revenge on the jester who replaced him and the knight, queen, and king who imprisoned him in a jack-in-a-box. Centuries later, once brilliant comedian-turned-asylum patient Lenny Ringtail escapes and fuses with the jester's spirit after finding the jack-in-a-box in a store and gains the ability to warp reality at a whim, this makes him virtually unstoppable and his only weakness is the small balls at the end of his fool's cap. Together they take revenge upon those who symbolized the ones' who imprisoned Madkat. He captured David Litterbin {Jester}, Mayor Manx {King}, Callie Briggs {Queen}, and Commander Feral {Knight}. After T-Bone destroys Madkat by hitting his weak spot, Ringtail's sanity and career were restored after he is knocked out by Razor and Commander Feral. Lenny guest-starred on the David Litterbin show to promote his bestselling book "Madkat and Me." He appeared only in "Enter the Madkat". This character is loosely based on television comedian Jay Leno and comedian Lenny Bruce, as a rival to David Litterbin (Letterman), and even has a catchphrase ("Here's Ringtail!") spoken just like Johnny Carson's intro on The Tonight Show and his clown appearance is similar to The Joker.
 The Red Lynx (voiced by Mark Hamill) – The ghost of a Mega War II flying ace who pilots a red biplane. T-Bone says he learned a lot about dogfighting from studying the Red Lynx's maneuvers. The Red Lynx stole a prototype plane from the Enforcers and tried to kill Mayor Manx, who was the great-grandson of his greatest opponent, the Blue Manx, but in the end, the SWAT Kats, along with Mayor Manx sent him to his doom by destroying the plane. His skill in flying in such is that even in his old museum biplane he was able to cause serious damage to the Turbokat. He only appeared in "The Ghost Pilot" and is a parody of the Red Baron.
 Lord Mutilor (voiced by Michael Dorn) – Mutilor is a giant lobster-like alien warlord who attacked Earth using a stolen Aquian spaceship to steal all of its water so he could sell it to a desert world. In the end, the SWAT Kats were able to kill him by blowing up his fighter craft and saving Captain Grimalken and his crew from harm. His name comes from a goldfish that Lance Falk's friend once owned. He appears only in "When Strikes Mutilor".
 First Officer Traag (voiced by Christopher Corey Smith) - Mutilor's henchman who heads up his army.
 Alien Guard Captain (voiced by Jim Cummings) - The leader of Mutilor's guard corps.
 Alien Guards and Pilots - Mutilor's goons who crew his ship and fly his fighter craft.
 Turmoil (voiced by Kath Soucie) – A villainous she-kat that wants to conquer Megakat City by controlling the airspace, with the help of her flying fortress, the Sky-Lion, and her squadron of female pilots, if the citizens of Megakat City don't pay her due first. She tried to seduce T-Bone, by showing him some of the modified airplanes that supposedly never went as far as the drawing board. But in the end, T-Bone fooled her. With the help of Razor, T-Bone put Turmoil in prison. T-Bone later sent a letter to Turmoil's prison cell. Writer Lance Falk created Turmoil because, besides Molly Mange, there were no other female villains. Her name is an anagram of "Mutilor" from When Strikes Mutilor. She appears only in "Cry Turmoil", though she was scheduled to appear in the unfinished episode "Turmoil II: The Revenge" where she, alongside some female inmates, escape from prison and use a laser from her flying fortress to threaten Megakat City.
 Lieutenant (voiced by Jennifer Hale) - An unnamed lieutenant who serves as Turmoil's second-in-command.
 Omega Squadron - Turmoil's all-female fighter squadron. Besides the pilots who fly Turmoil's high-tech jets, there are also her Security Guards and her Special Forces who guard the Sky-Lion.
 The Evil SWAT Kats (voiced by Barry Gordon and Charlie Adler) – Villainous variations of the SWAT Kats from a parallel dimension accessed by the real SWAT Kats by accident during a thunderstorm. They serve the alternate dimension's Dark Kat and plot with the alternate Callie Briggs to overthrow Megakat City's government. They exhibit alternate characteristics to the real SWAT Kats such as Razor being a bossy shot, T-Bone being a clumsy and a lousy pilot, and the two of them hating each other. They were presumably killed when a Mega-Detonator they were carrying imploded. This did not please Dark Kat or the alternate Callie Briggs who was secretly on Dark Kat's side. They appeared only in "The Dark Side of the SWAT Kats". The Dark SWAT Kats are the only characters shown in the alternate dimension who don't look like their counterparts, but only the viewers seemed to be able to tell the difference.
 Alternate Calico "Callie" Briggs (voiced by Tress MacNeille) - A version of Callie Briggs from an alternate dimension where the SWAT Kats are evil. She is in league with that reality's Dark Kat in his plans to take over Megakat City. When the evil SWAT Kats were destroyed by the Mega-Detonator imploding, Callie starts to flee her office only to be intercepted by the Enforcers who got the evidence of Callie's alliance with Dark Kat and is arrested by Lt. Felina.
 Mega-Scorpions - When Tiger Conklin of a mining company was illegally dumping toxic waste into a mining cavern, harmless cave scorpions were mutated into humanoid mutants later dubbed Mega-Scorpions with a hive mind, bringing food to the queen Mega-Scorpion. The Mega-Scorpions began preying on the miners which they fed to their leader. Mining foreman Taylor called in the Enforcers to help. However, Ann Gora managed to sneak into the cavern and the intrepid reporter was captured by one of the Mega-Scorpions. Lt. Feral and the SWAT Kats went in to find Ann Gora but the SWAT Kats new Turbo Mole went 8 miles below the surface, resulting in them finding the scorpions. Feral and the Swat Kats defeated hordes of the Mega-Scorpions and found Ann, but were forced to flee from the Mega-Scorpion Leader. The Mega-Scorpion Leader apparently fell into a pit of lava, but survived and attacked the SWAT Kats again as Conklin's illegal dumping is exposed leading to his arrest. The Mega-Scorpion Leader grabbed the Turbo Kat, but was finally destroyed when the Swat Kats flew into Earth's atmosphere which caused the leader to explode.
 Zed (voiced by Charlie Adler) - A Micro-Brain Repair Unit created by Dr. Leiter Greenbox, the robot later to be known as Zed was designed to analyze mechanical objects and reassemble them. However, after he was stolen by the Metallikats so they could repair themselves, Zed's programming was 'contaminated' by their criminal personalities, causing its artificial intelligence to evolve. As Zed evolved, it built a robot body out of metal parts it scrounged from machines all over the city (including the Metallikats), building his body bigger and bigger as he went along. Zed eventually headed towards Puma-Dyne in order to absorb a weapons satellite they had built called the Mega-Beam, intending to destroy the city with it. Zed even managed to merge its mind with that of its creator and was about to fire the Mega-Beam when T-Bone used a torn piece of cable to whip Zed's brain, destroying it.

Other characters
 Dr. Leiter Greenbox (voiced by Robert Patrick in "Chaos in Crystal," Nick Chinlund in "Unlikely Alloys") - A scientist whose inventions always seem to go wrong. In his first appearance, he was hired by Warden Cyrus Meece of Megakat Maximum Security Prison to a gem-mining gadget called the Gemkat 6000, designed to separate rare and precious stones from the rock without digging. But when Rex Shard, the prisoner testing the device, tried to steal some gems from the device, an explosion erupted which turned his body into a crystal. Dr. Greenbox attempted to rewire his prototype in order to reverse the effect, but he was turned into crystals by Shard and remained so until the SWAT Kats managed to cure Shard themselves. Later, while working at Megakat University, Dr. Greenbox created an artificially-intelligent device called a Micro-Brain Repair Unit, which, after having its programming contaminated by the Metallikats, evolved into a self-aware mechanical entity called Zed, building a robot body around itself using any metal objects it could get its hands on. Though Dr. Greenbox originally attempted to help the SWAT Kats destroy Zed, once, inside his head, he was so overwhelmed at how much his creation had evolved that he turned against them and merged with his machine; after Zed's brain was destroyed, Greenbox collapsed and was turned over to the Enforcers, after which his fate is uncertain.
 David Litterbin (voiced by John Byner) - An obvious parody of David Letterman, Litterbin was the undisputed "King of Late Night" and host of The David Litterbin Show. Razor was his biggest fan and he was seen on television numerous times. He actually appeared in "Enter the Madkat", where he was believed to have descended from the jester responsible for making Madkat insane, as years later, he won the title for "King of Late Night", making Lenny Ringtail insane.
 Burke and Murray (voiced by Mark Hamill and Charlie Adler) - Two brothers employed to dump junk in the salvage yard that Jake and Chance work in. Burke is the tall one and Murray is the short one. Their mocking attitudes constantly irritated Jake and Chance, but they were absent from the second season.
Little Old Lady (voiced by Candi Milo) - A cranky old lady whose car always seemed to be breaking down. She consistently threatened to report Jake and Chance to her auto club, but never actually did. On one occasion, she received a free pizza and three free tune-ups as an apology from Jake and Chance for when their vigilantism took priority over a towing job.
 Dr. N. Zyme (voiced by Paul Eiding) - A slightly absentminded biochemist who worked for Megakat Biochemical Labs. His intentions were to create anti-mutagens that would preserve and benefit katkind, but his biggest hope Viper Mutagen 368 proved to be worthless after Dr. Elrod Purvis, having died from attempting to rob Zyme of the formula, was revived as Dr. Viper (as seen in "The Origin of Dr Viper" in season two). Zyme presumably died in "The Giant Bacteria", when he tried to combat Viper's bacteria monsters with antibiotics His name is a pun on Enzyme.
 Captain Grimalken (voiced by Michael Bell) - Leader of the Aqueons, a race of blue-furred alien kats who are naturally nonviolent and peaceful; they would rather be taken prisoner than fight back. Grimalken was captain of the water freighter that Mutilor stole for his space-pirating purposes. Initially he told the SWAT Kats he would not help them fight, but at a crucial moment, and unseen by anyone else, he did kick a henchman in the face as the henchman was going for a blaster. In gratitude for the SWAT Kats (Razor and T-Bone) and Lt. Feral's actions, he used some of his "high-speed space technology" to repair the Turbokat, which Mutilor had damaged during a battle.

References

External links
Swat Kats - Cartoon Network Department of Cartoons (Archive)

SWAT Kats.us
The SWAT Kats Encyclopedia

Hanna-Barbera characters
Lists of characters in American television animation